The Sheikha Salama Mosque is a mosque in the city of Al Ain, Emirate of Abu Dhabi, the United Arab Emirates. Formerly the largest mosque in use in the city, it is named after Sheikhah Salamah, mother of Sheikh Zayed bin Sultan Al Nahyan, the father of Sheikh Khalifa.

Structure
The mosque had an old structure which was demolished in 2007.

The current structure of the mosque, which was designed by architect Ja'afar Touqan from Jordan, is a blend of ancient and modern architecture, with two minarets which are influenced by Moroccan Islamic architecture. The design includes an extra 1000 car parking spaces for "future needs."

History
This mosque won the Saudi Arabian award for architecture in 2017.

Its status as the largest mosque in Al-Ain was replaced by that of Sheikh Khalifa in 2021.

See also
 Islam in the United Arab Emirates
 Islamic architecture

References

External links
 Al Ain, Mosque "Sheika Salama" (Old structure) (YouTube)
 Sheikha Salama Mosque
 Abdullatif Al Fozan Award: Sheikha Salama
 Aces
 Beautiful Mosques

Mosques in Al Ain